is a passenger railway station located in the town of Itano, Itano District, Tokushima Prefecture, Japan. It is operated by JR Shikoku and has the station number "T07".

Lines
Itano Station is served by the JR Shikoku Kōtoku Line and is located 58.0 km from the beginning of the line at Takamatsu.

Layout
The station consists of an island platform and a side platform serving three tracks. The island platform has an old style tiled roof shelter and serves lines 1 and 2. Line 3 is served by the side platform which has a passing loop/siding running on the other side. The station building is located to the side of line 1. A footbridge from the station building gives access to the island platform and, beyond, to the side platform but a level crossing is also available. The station building houses a waiting room and a JR ticket window (without a Midori no Madoguchi facility). Parking is available at the station forecourt.

Platforms

History
Itano Station was opened 15 February 1923 under the name  by the privately run Awa Electric Railway (later the Awa Railway). The Awa Railway was nationalized on 1 July 1933 and Japanese Government Railways (JGR) took over control of the station. The track to Kajiyabara became part of the Kajiyabara Line with Banzai as the start point. The Kajiyabara Line was closed from 1 November 1943 to 15 July 1947 and on 10 April 1956 the station was renamed Itano Station. On 16 January 1972 the Kajiyabara Line was closed and the station was then served solely by the Kōtoku Main Line. On 1 April 1987:JNR (the successor to JGR) was privatized. JR Shikoku assumed control of the station. On 1 June 1988 the Kōtoku Main Line was renamed the Kōtoku Line.

Passenger statistics
In fiscal 2018, the station was used by an average of 936 passengers daily

Surrounding area
Itano Town Hall
Itano Municipal Itano Junior High School
Tokushima Prefectural Itano High School

See also
List of railway stations in Japan

References

External links

Itano Station (JR Shikoku)

Railway stations in Tokushima Prefecture
Railway stations in Japan opened in 1923
Itano, Tokushima